Michael Wieler (born 7 February 1981, in Wetzlar) is a German rower.

References 
 

1981 births
Living people
German male rowers
People from Wetzlar
Sportspeople from Giessen (region)
World Rowing Championships medalists for Germany